Brougham is a civil parish in the Eden District, Cumbria, England. It contains 17 buildings that are recorded in the National Heritage List for England. Of these, one is listed at Grade I, the highest of the three grades, six are at Grade II*, the middle grade, and the others are at Grade II, the lowest grade.  The parish is to the southeast of the town of Penrith, and is almost completely rural.  Two people are largely responsible for the more important buildings in the parish,  Lady Anne Clifford in the 17th century, and Lord Brougham in the 19th century.  The listed buildings include parts of a castle, later converted into a country house, a church, a chapel and its churchyard walls, a memorial pillar with an alms table, a house, farmhouses and farm buildings, two bridges, a milestone, and a parish boundary stone.


Key

Buildings

References

Citations

Sources

Lists of listed buildings in Cumbria